Eudianthe is a small genus of flowering plants in the family Caryophyllaceae, found in the Canary Islands and the western Mediterranean. It can be distinguished from other members of the tribe Sileneae by its linear to narrowly lanceolate leaves and its pink flowers.

Species
Currently accepted species include:

Eudianthe coeli-rosa (L.) Fenzl ex Endl.
Eudianthe laeta (Aiton) Rchb. ex Willk.
Eudianthe lagrangei (Coss.) Pau

References

Caryophyllaceae genera
Caryophyllaceae
Taxa named by Ludwig Reichenbach